Shur may refer to:

Places
Shur (Bible), a location in the Hebrew Bible
Shur-e Qarah Kand, a village in East Azerbaijan Province, Iran
Shur, Fars, a village in Iran
Shur, Qazvin, a village in Iran
Shur, Iranshahr, a village in Sistan and Baluchestan Province, Iran
Shur, Tehran, a village in Iran
Shur-e Bala, a village in Iran
Shur-e Sofla, a village in Iran
Shur Qazi, a village in Iran

People
Gerald Shur (1933-2020), American lawyer, and the founder of the US Federal Witness Protection Program
Itaal Shur (born 1966), American songwriter
Michael Shur (born 1942), Soviet-born American professor of solid-state electronics and physics

Other uses
USS Shur (SP-782), a United States Navy patrol boat 1917–1919
Dastgāh-e Šur, an Iranian/Persian musical mode
Shur (mugham), an Azerbaijani musical mode